Rosmarie Müller (born March 27, 1958) is a retired female long-distance runner from Switzerland. She set her personal best (2:35:26) in the marathon in 1988.

Achievements
All results regarding marathon, unless stated otherwise

References
 sports-reference

1958 births
Living people
Swiss female marathon runners
Olympic athletes of Switzerland
Athletes (track and field) at the 1988 Summer Olympics